Xanthocaecilius is a genus of lizard barklice in the family Caeciliusidae. There are at least 2 described species in Xanthocaecilius.

Species
 Xanthocaecilius quillayute (Chapman, 1930)
 Xanthocaecilius sommermanae (Mockford, 1955)

References

Further reading

 

Caeciliusidae